The Gilsum Stone Arch Bridge carries Surry Road over the Ashuelot River in Gilsum, New Hampshire. Built in 1862–63, it is one of the highest stone arch bridges in the state. It stands on the site of four previous bridges, where the river passes through a deep gorge. The previous bridge was also a stone arch bridge, which was built in 1860 and collapsed (due to inferior construction) a few months later. It was designed by William Leonard Kingsbury, a local official; its builders are not known because the town's records were destroyed in a fire. The present bridge's vault is carefully constructed from dry-laid granite voussoirs that were shaped for a very precise fit, with larger stones at the lower ends of the arch, and a smaller ones at the crown. Some of the stones were left with rough surfaces, while others were hammered smooth.

In contrast to the fine stonework of the arch, the abutments and retaining walls are constructed of split-faced granite in irregular courses, wedged in place by stone chips.  The northeast abutment continues along the river as a wing wall up to a massive stone pier, the former site of a mill dam.  The southeast abutment is a granite reconstruction of coursed ashlar over concrete, done in 1951.  The original granite coping which lined the roadway shoulders has been replaced by concrete with steel guard cables, c. 1920s.

The bridge was listed on the National Register of Historic Places in 1989.

See also

List of bridges on the National Register of Historic Places in New Hampshire
National Register of Historic Places listings in Cheshire County, New Hampshire
New Hampshire Historical Marker No. 168: Gilsum Stone Arch Bridge

References

External links

Road bridges on the National Register of Historic Places in New Hampshire
Bridges completed in 1863
Bridges in Cheshire County, New Hampshire
1863 establishments in New Hampshire
National Register of Historic Places in Cheshire County, New Hampshire
Stone arch bridges in the United States